Young Guns II is a 1990 American Western action film and a sequel to Young Guns (1988). It stars Emilio Estevez, Kiefer Sutherland, Lou Diamond Phillips, and Christian Slater, and features William Petersen as Pat Garrett. It was written by John Fusco and directed by Geoff Murphy.

It follows the life of Billy the Kid (played by Emilio Estevez), in the years following the Lincoln County War in which Billy was part of "The Regulators" – a group of around six highly skilled gunmen avenging the death of John Tunstall – and the years leading up to Billy's documented death. The film, however, is told by Brushy Bill Roberts, a man who in 1950 appeared claiming to be the real Billy the Kid.

While the film takes some creative license, it does show some of the main events leading up to Billy's documented death, including his talks with Governor Lew Wallace, his capture by friend-turned-foe Pat Garrett, his trial, and his subsequent escape in which he killed two deputies.

Plot
In 1950, attorney Charles Phalen is contacted by elderly "Brushy Bill" Roberts, who seeks a pardon he was promised 70 years earlier by the governor of the New Mexico Territory. Dismissing Bill's claim that he is really William H. Bonney aka "Billy The Kid", widely believed to have been killed in 1881, Phalen asks if Bill has any proof.

Bill's story begins in 1879, as the famed outlaw has formed a new gang with "Arkansas" Dave Rudabaugh and Pat Garrett. In the wake of the Lincoln County War, New Mexico Governor Lew Wallace has issued warrants for the arrest of everyone involved. Billy's former compatriot Doc Scurlock, now a schoolteacher in New York, is captured and imprisoned alongside fellow Regulator Jose Chavez y Chavez and their old enemies.

Now the most wanted man in New Mexico, Billy meets with Governor Wallace, who agrees to pardon him if he testifies against the Dolan-Murphy faction. Instead, Billy discovers he has been tricked into being arrested with no chance of testifying. He escapes, returning with Dave and Garrett and posing as a lynch mob to free Doc and Chavez, who reluctantly join them on the "Mexican Blackbird" trail to Mexico. Desperate for reinforcements, the gang accepts farmer Hendry William French and teenage Yankee Tom O'Folliard, while Garrett decides to stay behind to open a boarding house.

Billy demands a $500 debt from former ally John Chisum, leaving two of the cattle baron's men dead. Furious, Chisum joins Wallace and they offer Garrett the job of Lincoln County sheriff and $1000 to hunt Bonney down. Forming a posse, Garrett recruits a journalist to document their pursuit. Billy leaves a taunting message for Garrett, and Rudabaugh tries to dig up an Apache burial ground, resulting in a knife fight with the Mexican-Indian Chavez.

Billy and the gang reach the town of White Oaks, spending the night at a bordello run by his former companion Jane Greathouse. A lynch mob gathers, and Deputy Carlyle offers to let the gang go in exchange for handing over Chavez, but Billy dresses the deputy as Chavez and pushes him outside, where he is shot dead by the mob. Garrett tracks the gang to the bordello and burns it down, while Jane strips naked to humiliate the townsfolk and rides away.

The gang is followed closely by Garrett's posse and Tom is shot dead by Garrett, leading Billy to admit that the Mexican Blackbird was only a ruse to keep the gang together. Doc tries to leave for home, but is shot by one of Garrett's men and sacrifices himself to enable his friends to escape, though Chavez is wounded and Billy is captured. Brought back to Lincoln, Billy is sentenced to death and is visited by Jane. She leaves him a pistol in the outhouse, which he uses to kill two guards and escape to Fort Sumner.

Billy finds his gang, but Dave has fled for Mexico, and a dying Chavez leaves to meet his fate alone. That night, an unarmed Billy is confronted by Garrett, and asks to be allowed to run to Mexico while Garrett tells the authorities that he killed him. Certain that Billy would not be able to resist coming back to the United States, Garrett refuses, and prepares to shoot Billy in the back. In the morning, a burial is held for Billy, but Garrett's horse is taken by an unseen figure.

In 1950, Brushy Bill concludes his story, convincing Phalen that he is Billy the Kid. An epilogue reveals that Dave was beheaded in Mexico as a warning to other outlaws; Garrett's book was a failure and he was shot and killed in 1908; Brushy Bill met with the governor of New Mexico, but despite corroboration from several surviving friends of the Kid, he was discredited and died less than a month later; whether or not he was Billy the Kid remains a mystery.

Cast

Additionally, Jon Bon Jovi briefly appears in a nonspeaking role as a bandit who attempts escaping during the prison scene.

Production

Development and writing
Screenwriter-producer John Fusco culled much of Billy's dialogue from actual newspaper interviews and reports between 1879 and 1881. Fusco also appears as the "Branded Man" in the prison pit escape scene alongside Jon Bon Jovi. The cattle brand on Fusco's face reads J.C. for cattle rancher John Chisum.

John Chisum, played by James Coburn, in the film convinces Pat Garrett to accept a job as the new Lincoln County Sheriff. Coburn himself played Garrett in Sam Peckinpah's Pat Garrett and Billy the Kid (1973).

Historical accuracy
The historical Josiah "Doc" Scurlock lived to the age of 80 and died a respectable man in Eastland, Texas in 1929. The film's original screenplay accurately portrays Scurlock as heading to Texas with his bride. It has been reported that Kiefer Sutherland, faced with scheduling conflicts, refused to return to the Young Guns franchise unless his character died in the movie's "Stinking Springs Shoot Out". Writer John Fusco fought against this demand but ultimately rewrote the scene to accommodate Sutherland's schedule.

Similarly, José Chavez y Chavez's death in the movie is also an inaccurate portrayal. The real Chavez y Chavez also lived to be an old man and passed away at the age of 72 in 1924. In both Young Guns I and II, he fights mainly with knives but historical records show that he was as skilled a gunman as the others.

Although Tom O'Folliard was indeed shot by Pat Garrett, he was not from Pennsylvania and nor was he a young boy. He was played by a 14-year-old Balthazar Getty in the film but in real life he was 20–21 years old when he died.

Music

Soundtrack
Emilio Estevez originally approached Jon Bon Jovi to ask him for permission to include the song "Wanted Dead Or Alive" on the soundtrack. Bon Jovi didn't feel the song's lyrics were appropriate; however, he was inspired by the project and resolved to write a new song for the film that would be more in keeping with the period and setting. He quickly wrote the song "Blaze of Glory", and performed it on acoustic guitar in the Utah desert for Estevez and John Fusco. "Blaze of Glory" went on to reach No. 1 on the Billboard Hot 100. Jon Bon Jovi would go on to name his debut solo album Blaze of Glory (released as Young Guns II: Blaze Of Glory in the UK), which included the eponymous single as well as other songs from and inspired by the film.

The album peaked at No. 3 on the Billboard 200 and No. 2 on the UK Albums Chart.

Jon Bon Jovi also made a cameo appearance in the film, as one of the prisoners in the pit with Doc and Chavez (he can be seen 28 minutes and 8 seconds into the movie).

Score
The film's original score was composed and conducted by Alan Silvestri, who provided string arrangements for the song "Santa Fe" and has one brief track on Blaze Of Glory. On September 19, 2011 Intrada Records issued Silvestri's score on its own CD.

 Scars (5:10)
 Small Hands (3:04)
 Lynch Mob (4:11)
 Finish the Game (2:50)
 Yoo Hoo (2:43)
 Devil's Deal (1:26)
 More Than Hello (2:34)
 Tom Sees the Light (1:30)
 Coy Dog (2:38)
 Ride to Guano City (1:09) ("Guano City" on Blaze of Glory)
 Battle (2:46)
 Little Tom Dies (6:49)
 Garrett's Place (1:10)
 Chavez's Wound (3:01)
 You Gonna Shoot? (3:33)
 Stolen Horse (Finale) (1:18)

On July 20, 2018, Rusted Wave released a limited edition of 1000 double LP vinyl pressing of Alan Silvertri's score cut at 45 RPM.

Reception

Box office
Young Guns II opened on August 1, 1990, in the United States in 1,770 theaters, accumulating $8,017,438 over its opening weekend. It finished third for the weekend, behind Ghost (in its fourth week) and Presumed Innocent (in its second week). The film went on to gross $44,143,410 in the United States and Canada. Internationally it grossed $15 million for a worldwide total of $59 million. The film was also successful on video rental.

Critical response
Young Guns II received mostly negative reviews by critics when it was first released. On review aggregator Rotten Tomatoes, the film has received a 28% approval rating by critics based on 25 reviews. Metacritic gave the film a score of 47 out of 100, based on 18 critics, indicating "mixed or average reviews". Audiences polled by CinemaScore gave the film an average grade of "A-" on an A+ to F scale.

The Los Angeles Times said it was “Full of sound, gunfire, fury and scorchingly beautiful landscapes, Young Guns II generates more sheer visual excitement than any Western since Peckinpah and Leone were in their last '70s prime." Roger Ebert, who gave Young Guns II 2 stars out of 4 stars, stated that "the screenplay feels unfinished, the direction is ambling, but the performances are interesting." Chris Hicks from Deseret News gave the film 2 out of 4 stars, stating Young Guns II was "sumptuously shot, very well-acted and full of potential."

Accolades

Sequel
In January 2021, a sequel was teased by screenwriter John Fusco who shared a mock poster for Young Guns 3: Alias Billy the Kid. In March, Estevez told Collider people were interested in seeing him play the character again and that a third film is "definitely in the works."
In September 2021, more information came out about the sequel, including that Lou Diamond Phillips and Christian Slater would return to the franchise.

References

External links

 
 

1990 films
1990 action films
American Western (genre) films
Biographical films about Billy the Kid
Cultural depictions of Pat Garrett
Biographical films about criminals
American buddy action films
American sequel films
Films set in New Mexico
Films shot in New Mexico
Films directed by Geoff Murphy
Films scored by Alan Silvestri
Lincoln County Wars
20th Century Fox films
Morgan Creek Productions films
Films with screenplays by John Fusco
1990s English-language films
1990s American films